Kordovan-e Raisi (also Romanized as Kordovān-e Ra'īsī) is a village in Kabgan Rural District, Kaki District, Dashti County, Bushehr Province, Iran. At the 2006 census, its population was 281, in 59 families.

References 

Populated places in Dashti County